Tatargina picta is a moth in the family Erebidae. Francis Walker first described it in 1865. It is found in China (Hainan, Guangdong, Yunnan, Guangxi) and Taiwan.

References

Moths described in 1865
Spilosomina